Samuel Trevor Francis (19 November 1834 – 28 December 1925) was an English lay preacher and hymn writer, with the Plymouth Brethren. He is best known as the author of the hymn "Oh the Deep, Deep Love of Jesus". He earned his living as a merchant.

References

External links
 

1834 births
1925 deaths
English hymnwriters
British Plymouth Brethren